Memory Project is a nonprofit organization that invites art teachers and their students to create portraits for youth around the world who have faced substantial challenges, such as neglect, abuse, loss of parents, and extreme poverty.

The intent of the portraits is to help the children feel valued and important, to know that many people care about their well-being, and to act as meaningful pieces of personal history in the future.  For art students who participate, the project is intended to be an opportunity to creatively practice kindness and global awareness.

To do this, the Memory Project receives photos of children and teens from global charities operating residential homes, schools, and care centers in a number of different countries every year.

Memory Project then provides art teachers with full-page color prints as well as digital copies of those photos, along with plastic sleeves to protect the finished portraits.  The art teachers then work with their students to create the portraits, and the Memory Project's staff members hand-deliver them to their recipients.

Memory Project always has several different art students create portraits based on different poses for each child involved.

External links
Memory Project official site
Washington Post

Children's charities based in the United States
Charities based in Wisconsin
Children's arts organizations